Kopala studienku is a Slovak folk song whose melody has served as the basis for Slovakia's national anthem, "Nad Tatrou sa blýska".

Lyrics
Kopala studienku

Kopala studienku, pozerala do nej,
či je tak hlboká, ako je široká,
skočila by do nej, ej, skočila by do nej.

A na tej studienke napájala páva,
povedzže mi, milá, holubienka sivá,
kohože si panna, ej, kohože si panna?

A ja ti nepoviem, lebo sama neviem,
prídi na večer k nám, mamky sa opýtam,
potom ti ja poviem, ej, potom ti ja poviem.

English translation:
She was digging a well

She was digging a well, she was looking into it,
whether it is as deep, as it is wide,
she'd jump into it, oh, she'd jump into it.
 
And from that well she let a peacock drink,
tell me dear gray dove,
whose maiden am I, oh, whose maiden am I?1
 
Do not ask, 'cause i don't know myself,
come over in the evening, come over in the evening,
you'll get to know from mother, oh, you'll get to know from mother.

1Text switches from 3rd person singing about the girl, to the girl singing about herself in 1st person.

External links
 Kopala studienku (Slovak folk song - base of Slovak anthem) on Youtube

Slovak songs